Glinnik  (German: Lehmfeld; 1943-1945) is a village in the administrative district of Gmina Zgierz, within Zgierz County, Łódź Voivodeship, in central Poland.

In 2005 the village had a population of 70. It is the seat of the sołectwo of Glinnik, which also includes the villages Palestyna, Samotnik, Siedlisko and Wołyń. The sołectwo had a population of 224 in 2005.

It is not to be confused with the nearby village of the same name in Gmina Głowno

References

Glinnik